The Women's Super League is the top tier of women's football in England. The league began in 2011, supplanting the FA Women's Premier League National Division as the highest level of women's football in England.

As of the end of the 2021–22 FA WSL season, Emma Hayes holds the record for most games managed in the WSL with 168, all with Chelsea, which she managed from 14 August 2012 to present. The most successful manager in the WSL is Emma Hayes, who won five league titles with Chelsea between 2015 and 2022. Matt Beard has managed the most teams in the WSL, having taken charge of four different clubs: Chelsea, Liverpool, West Ham United and Bristol City.

Current Women's Super League managers

List of all-time managerial appointments
The list of managers includes everyone who has managed a club while they were in the WSL, whether in a permanent or temporary role. Interim managers are listed only when they managed the team for at least one match in that period.

Notes:

By club

By nationality

Records

Managers listed in bold are currently managing in the WSL. Does not include caretaker/interim managers who never took on a permanent role.

Most games

Most wins

Highest win percentage

Lowest win percentage

Achievements

Title winning managers
By season

By manager

Manager of the Year awards

Below is a list of all the recipients named as WSL manager of the year either at The FA Women's Football Awards (2011–18), by the League Managers Association (2019) or Women's Super League awards (2020–present):

Number of wins in brackets.

References

External links

 
Women's Super League